Felix Gordon Giles, DSO (23 November 1885—22 June 1950) was an Australian engineer who served as an officer in ANZAC's 10th Battalion during World War I.

Early life and education 
Giles was born in Darwin on 23 November 1885 to Alfred Giles and Mary Augusta Giles (née Sprigg). He was educated at St Peter's College, Adelaide and passed a three-year course at the School of Mines in electrical engineering. Giles married Elsie Kilpack on 24 July 24, 1909. He worked for the electrical branch of the General Post Office and later the Adelaide Electric Lighting and Traction Company.

Military career 
Giles enlisted in the South Australian Scottish Infantry in May 1908 and rose through the ranks. He was promoted to corporal in March 1910, to sergeant in September 1910 and to 2nd lieutenant on 21 August 1911. After the outbreak of World War I Giles was transferred to the Australian Imperial Force and assigned command of the 10th Battalion's G Company. In January 1915, when his company was merged with D Company, Giles became second-in-command of the company.

Giles was promoted to captain in September 1914. He participated in the Gallipoli Campaign, assuming command of D Company when the company commander was wounded. He was one of only four officers within the 3rd Brigade to serve continuously from the first landing to the evacuation.

In March 1916 Giles was promoted to major. At the Battle of Pozières he was gassed and suffered multiple concussions from near misses of high explosive shells. He persisted and led his men into defensive positions, conduct that brought him the second recommendation for the DSO. His coolness under fire was praised by his fellow officers. In January 1917 Giles suffered from shell shock after being wounded during a reconnaissance.
His conduct at the capture of Le Barque, where he harassed the German rearguard during their withdrawal, earned him a mention in Alexander Haig's dispatches on 9 April 2017, and later that year he was awarded the DSO for "services rendered in the prosecution of the war".

After the war Giles resumed his civilian work as an electrical engineer. He became a meter superintendent with the Adelaide Electric Supply Company.

References 

1885 births
1950 deaths
Australian military personnel of World War I
Australian Companions of the Distinguished Service Order
People from Darwin, Northern Territory
Military personnel from the Northern Territory